Once Upon a Christmas may refer to:

Once Upon a Christmas (Kenny Rogers and Dolly Parton album), 1984
Once Upon a Christmas (Mormon Tabernacle Choir album), 2012
Once Upon a Christmas: The Original Story, a children's album
Once Upon a Christmas (film), released 2000
Mickey's Once Upon a Christmas, an animated movie, released direct to video in 1999